Genie is a modern, general-purpose high-level programming language in development since 2008. It was designed as an alternative, simpler and cleaner dialect for the Vala compiler, while preserving the same functionality of the Vala language. Genie uses the same compiler and libraries as Vala; the two can indeed be used alongside each other. The differences are only syntactic.

Genie's syntax is derived from numerous modern languages like Python, Boo, D and Delphi. In the vein of Python, Genie uses indentation rather than explicit block delimiters (like, for example, curly brackets) to delimit blocks.

Like Vala, Genie uses the GObject type system to create classes and interfaces declared in Genie source code, without imposing additional runtime requirements (i.e., unlike Python, Java or C#, it does not require a virtual machine).

Genie allows access to C libraries, especially those based in GObject (like GTK), without using a different application binary interface (ABI). During compilation, the code is first translated to C source and header files, which are then compiled to platform-specific machine code using any available C compiler like GCC, thus allowing cross-platform software development.

Programs developed in Vala and Genie do not depend on the GNOME Desktop Environment, usually requiring only GLib.

Code samples

"Hello World" 
This sample explicitly uses four spaces for indentation.
[indent=4]

init
    print "Hello, world!"

Objects 
With no explicit indentation declaration, the default is tabs.
class Sample

	def run()
		stdout.printf("Hello, world! \n ")

init
	var sample = new Sample()
	sample.run()

Criticism 

, Genie for loops are inclusive, which makes handling of empty lists cumbersome:

However, the lists can be iterated using for-in construct easily and straightforward:

References

External links 
 
 
 Using the Genie programming language under Puppy Linux
 Puppy Linux: Vala and Genie Programming
 API Documentation
 search github projects written in genie

2008 software
Cross-platform free software
GTK language bindings
High-level programming languages
Object-oriented programming languages
Programming languages created in 2008
Software using the LGPL license
Statically typed programming languages